Vexillum (Pusia) speciosum, common name : the specious mitre, is a species of small sea snail, marine gastropod mollusk in the family Costellariidae, the ribbed miters.

Description
The shell size varies between 15 mm and 22 mm

Distribution
This species is distributed in the Indian Ocean along Réunion, Chagos and the Mascarene basin

References

 Sheppard, A (1984). The molluscan fauna of Chagos (Indian Ocean) and an analysis of its broad distribution patterns. Coral Reefs 3: 43–50
 Drivas, J. & M. Jay (1988). Coquillages de La Réunion et de l'île Maurice
 Turner H. 2001. Katalog der Familie Costellariidae Macdonald, 1860. Conchbooks. 1-100 page(s): 60

External links
 
 Reeve, L. A. (1844-1845). Monograph of the genus Mitra. In: Conchologia Iconica, or, illustrations of the shells of molluscous animals, vol. 2, pl. 1-39 and unpaginated text. L. Reeve & Co., London.

speciosum
Gastropods described in 1844